Soyuz MS-24 is a planned Russian crewed Soyuz spaceflight to launch from Baikonur in June 2023 to the International Space Station.

The mission was planned to be launched in September 2023 but it was advanced to June to remove external radiator coolant leak concerns on Soyuz MS-23 as it happened with Soyuz MS-22 and Progress MS-21.

Crew
The original three-Russian member crew for this scenario was named in May 2021. American astronaut Loral O'Hara replaced Andrey Fedyaev as a part of the Soyuz-Dragon crew swap system of keeping at least one NASA astronaut and one Roscosmos cosmonaut on each of the crew rotation missions. This ensures both countries have a presence on the station, and the ability to maintain their separate systems if either Soyuz or commercial crew vehicles are grounded for an extended period. They were originally assigned to Soyuz MS-23 mission, but were moved to MS-24, due to Soyuz MS-22 coolant leak accident that required MS-23 to be launched uncrewed as its replacement.

Primary Crew

Backup crew

References 

Crewed Soyuz missions
Future human spaceflights
2023 in spaceflight
2023 in Russia